Fruit Hill is a census-designated place (CDP) in Hamilton County, Ohio, United States. The population was 3,748 at the 2020 census.

Geography
Fruit Hill is located at  (39.070912, -84.364707).

Demographics

At the 2000 census there were 3,945 people, 1,428 households, and 1,118 families living in the CDP. The population density was 3,153.2 people per square mile (1,218.5/km). There were 1,452 housing units at an average density of 1,160.6/sq mi (448.5/km).  The racial makeup of the CDP was 97.49% White, 0.79% African American, 0.30% Native American, 1.06% Asian, 0.03% from other races, and 0.33% from two or more races. Hispanic or Latino of any race were 0.63%.

Of the 1,428 households 39.6% had children under the age of 18 living with them, 67.3% were married couples living together, 8.2% had a female householder with no husband present, and 21.7% were non-families. 19.5% of households were one person and 9.7% were one person aged 65 or older. The average household size was 2.68 and the average family size was 3.08.

The age distribution was 26.8% under the age of 18, 5.6% from 18 to 24, 27.9% from 25 to 44, 24.4% from 45 to 64, and 15.3% 65 or older. The median age was 39 years. For every 100 females, there were 92.5 males. For every 100 females age 18 and over, there were 85.4 males.

The median household income was $61,397 and the median family income  was $68,676. Males had a median income of $45,306 versus $36,250 for females. The per capita income for the CDP was $28,145. About 2.5% of families and 2.5% of the population were below the poverty line, including 1.8% of those under age 18 and none of those age 65 or over.

References

Census-designated places in Hamilton County, Ohio
Census-designated places in Ohio